Arizona Stage Coach is a 1942 American Western film directed by S. Roy Luby. The film is the sixteenth in Monogram Pictures' "Range Busters" series, and it stars Ray "Crash" Corrigan as Crash, John "Dusty" King as Dusty and Max "Alibi" Terhune as Alibi, with Nell O'Day, Charles King and Riley Hill.

This is the last film in the series with the original main cast; in the next film, Texas to Bataan, "Davy" Sharpe replaces "Crash" Corrigan.

Premise 
The Range Busters take on a gang of stagecoach robbers who are operating with the assistance of crooked employees of Wells Fargo.

Cast 
 Ray Corrigan as Crash Corrigan
 John 'Dusty' King as Dusty King
 Max Terhune as Alibi Terhune
 Elmer as Elmer, Alibi's dummy
 Nell O'Day as Dorrie Willard
 Charles King as Tim Douglas
 Riley Hill as Ernie Willard
 Kermit Maynard as Henchman Strike Cardigan
 Carl Mathews as Henchman Ace
 Slim Whitaker as Henchman Red
 Slim Harkey as Henchman
 Steve Clark as Jake – Stage Driver-Henchman
 Frank Ellis as Dan – Stage Shotgun-Guard / Henchman
 Jack Ingram as Sheriff Denver
 Stanley Price as Tex Laughlin – Hold-Up Man
 Forrest Taylor as Uncle Larry Meadows

Soundtrack 
 John "Dusty" King – "Red River Valley" (Music by James Kerrigen)
 John "Dusty" King – "Where The Grass Grows Greener in the Valley" (Music by Rudy Sooter)

See also
The Range Busters series:
 The Range Busters (1940)
 Trailing Double Trouble (1940)
 West of Pinto Basin (1940)
 Trail of the Silver Spurs (1941)
 The Kid's Last Ride (1941)
 Tumbledown Ranch in Arizona (1941)
 Wrangler's Roost (1941)
 Fugitive Valley (1941)
 Saddle Mountain Roundup (1941)
 Tonto Basin Outlaws (1941)
 Underground Rustlers (1941)
 Thunder River Feud (1942)
 Rock River Renegades (1942)
 Boot Hill Bandits (1942)
 Texas Trouble Shooters (1942)
 Arizona Stage Coach (1942)
 Texas to Bataan (1942)
 Trail Riders (1942)
 Two Fisted Justice (1943)
 Haunted Ranch (1943)
 Land of Hunted Men (1943)
 Cowboy Commandos (1943)
 Black Market Rustlers (1943)
 Bullets and Saddles (1943)

External links 
 
 

1942 films
1940s English-language films
American black-and-white films
Monogram Pictures films
1942 Western (genre) films
Films set in Arizona
American Western (genre) films
Films directed by S. Roy Luby
Range Busters
1940s American films